Dudan may refer to:

Dudan, Iran, village
Alessandro Dudan, Dalmatian Italian irredentist
Pierre Dudan, writer of Softly, Softly (song)

See also
Dudani

Italian-language surnames
Croatian surnames